High Quality United FC, sometimes known as High Quality FC, is a Bhutanese football club based in Thimphu. The club currently operates only with youth selections, as the senior squad was disbanded prior to the 2022 season.

History
High Quality United first appeared in the 2017 Thimphu League, in which they won six games, lost seven, and drew once against the Bhutan U-19s with a score of 0–0. They finished their inaugural season in fifth place. As they did not place in the top 3, they did not qualify to the 2017 Bhutan National League, but they were not relegated and competed again in the 2018 Thimphu League.

Honours
Bhutan Super League
Winners: 2020
Runners-up: 2019

References

Football clubs in Bhutan
Association football clubs established in 2015
2015 establishments in Bhutan